is a Japanese heavy metal musician and songwriter. She is best known as guitarist of the all-female band Mary's Blood from 2012 until they began an indefinite hiatus in 2022. She is currently a member of the all-female band Nemophila and one-half of the duo Amahiru with Frédéric Leclercq. Saki has been sponsored by Killer Guitars for over ten years, and often uses custom-made Fascist models. In 2021, they released her signature model, the seven-string KG-Fascinator Seven the Empress.

Early life
Saki's father listened to Western music of the 1970s and 1980s, but she did not fall in love with it until junior high. She started playing classical and electric guitar in junior high school. Although a member of the brass band since elementary school, a friend asked her to join the classical guitar club in junior high. There she played music by Southern All Stars, Spitz and the Beatles and developed her love of Western rock and pop music. She received her first electric guitar from the father of one of her younger brother's classmates. Brian May was the first guitarist she became a fan of and Queen + Paul Rodgers were the first musicians she ever saw live. Saki was inspired to become a musician after seeing footage of Seikima-II's reunion on NHK and wanting to be their guitarist Jail O'Hashi. In high school she was in a cover band named , with whom she had her first live performance competing in a contest judged by Seikima-II guitarist Ace Shimizu. Also in high school, Saki performed with Rolly at an acoustic guitar seminar he held. From 2009 to 2010, she was a member of the pioneering all-female heavy metal band Destrose.

Career

Mixx and Mary's Blood: 2010–2022
While majoring in Chinese at university, Saki made her professional debut in July 2010 as a member of the all-female rock trio Mixx alongside vocalist Asuka and drummer Jackson. Record label Exellex released their first two singles, "Agepoyo Let's Go!" and "Bye 3", on October 13 and the band played their first concert on October 29. A third single, "Heavy Metal Sweets", was released on January 12, 2011. All three were composed by Kiyoshi (hide with Spread Beaver). Saki participated in the Muon no Yaon charity event hosted by Show-Ya on May 7, 2011. Admission was free but donations were encouraged to aid recovery from the 2011 Tōhoku earthquake and tsunami, which is the reason the concert used as little electricity as possible.  Mixx ended in May 2011, before the June 8 release of their fourth single "Lil' Devil's Lullaby" and August 10 release of their self-titled album; both of which Saki appears on. In August 2011, Saki started the Vocaloid trio Re:Maker with bassist Fin and drummer Anri. They released the mini-album Neo-Invasion on August 25, 2012, but have not been active since 2013.

In 2012, Saki joined the all-female heavy metal band Mary's Blood. She already knew the members, who were also previously in Destrose, before they asked her to audition when their guitarists were leaving. She has since become the main composer of songs in the band. Mary's Blood performed their first international show in Houston, Texas at Anime Matsuri 2013, and then signed to major record label Nippon Columbia for the release of their first album Countdown to Evolution on August 20, 2014. Readers of heavy metal magazine Burrn! voted Mary's Blood second place in its best new artist category. The band switched to Victor Entertainment for their second album, Bloody Palace on October 7, 2015. Mary's Blood switched labels again for their fourth album Revenant, released on April 18, 2018 by Tokuma Japan Communications. After two studio more albums, Mary's Blood began an indefinite hiatus on April 9, 2022.

Saki played guitar on two songs from Zwei's 2015 album Neo Masque and two songs from Animetal the Second's 2016 album Blizzard of Animetal the Second. She also contributed guitar to the song "Frozen Rose" from the 2017 album Astraia by Yashiro, Mary's Blood's live support guitarist. After taking part in a similar performance at Naon no Yaon 2017, Saki organized the World Guitar Girls Collection project which features several female rock guitarists playing famous songs in instrumental medley format. World Guitar Girls Collection Vol. 0 took place on July 17, 2017 and featured a performance by five guitarists, but was mainly a Mary's Blood and Cyntia concert. Another performance took place at that year's Classic Rock Jam on November 25, but the first standalone World Guitar Girls Collection concert was held on August 19, 2018. Saki also played on three singles by the horror punk idol group XTeen; 2018's "Eclipse" and "Romanticist", and 2019's "The New Black".

Nemophila and Amahiru: 2019–present
Saki met vocalist Mayu through a mutual friend and was part of a backing band that supported her at an August 2019 live session. Feeling that the line-up was too good to be a one-off, the musicians decided to form a real band. According to drummer Tamu Murata, Saki was initially only going to act as a supervisor to the group, before deciding to join as a full member. After playing their first concerts on September 14 and 15 as part of Metal Weekend 2019 at Zepp Diver City, where they opened for Loudness and HammerFall, Nemophila released their first single "Oiran" on February 29, 2020. "Raitei", their second single, was released on August 22, 2020. Third single "Dissension" followed on February 28, 2021. On June 25, 2021, British record label JPU Records released Oiran - Extended Edition, which compiles the band's entire discography up to that point from the singles sold only via Nemophila's official website and a newly recorded English version of "Dissension". Nemophila released their first album Revive on December 14, 2021.

In 2020, Saki formed the musical project Amahiru with French musician Frédéric Leclercq, who came up with the name in a dream. Saki performs lead guitar, while Leclercq plays lead, rhythm and bass guitar. The two first met in 2015 when Mary's Blood opened for Leclercq's then-band, DragonForce, in Hong Kong. Saki said they discussed making music that combines western and eastern elements, and when she talked about making a solo album, her record label suggested she ask Leclercq to play on it, "But it was so fun to work with him and we both had a lot of ideas, so we decided to make Amahiru as its own project." Amahiru's self-titled debut album was released worldwide on November 27, 2020, and features British vocalist Archie Wilson, Dutch keyboardist Coen Janssen, and American drummer Mike Heller. It also features shakuhachi player Kifu Mitsuhashi, and guest performances by Elize Ryd and Sean Reinert.

Also in 2020, Saki took part in Shred Racers Online F2, an event produced by Young Guitar Magazine and Nippon Cultural Broadcasting to showcase technical guitarists. The event released a cover of Lisa's "Gurenge" and the original song "Richromatic", both of which feature Saki alongside several other musicians. Saki began a solo career with the February 10, 2021, release of the instrumental "Brightness", which features Leclercq on bass, Epica keyboardist Coen Janssen, and drummer Shun Minari from Blindman.

Songwriting
When composing, Saki said she has to think about the person who will be singing the song because the vocalists for Mary's Blood, Nemophila and Amahiru are all different. For example, Mayu likes to scream sometimes and Archie is a man. She described Mary's Blood as a straight heavy metal band, but because they have many different styles of songs, she feels free to make whatever sounds she wants with them. The guitarist explained that Eye and Rio love visual kei music, which sometimes makes it difficult to find the tones to match the vocals. When writing for Mary's Blood, she composes practically everything in the song, except for some drum fills that Mari comes up with. Saki played a seven-string guitar for the first time on their 2016 song "Angel's Ladder", while 2018's "On the Rocks" marked the first time she played a bottleneck guitar solo.

Saki said the most important thing in Nemophila is to play "hard music like metalcore, but make it 'yurufuwa', to give it more of a personality. A Japanese word, it means... fluffy and smooth." In Nemophila, there is a composer team who works behind the scenes, so Saki and the team compose the songs at the same time and give the members the MIDI data. In general, Saki said she plays her guitar with a slightly lower sound than fellow guitarist Hazuki.

Saki described the music of Amahiru as more hard rock in comparison to Mary's Blood's straight heavy metal, and feels it should therefore be a "little more modern" and have less distortion. She also said that she plays a lot more aggressive than in Mary's Blood. Both Saki and Leclercq wrote songs for the project, but it was Leclercq who felt having the European style from him and the Japanese style from her would "sound really cool" together. Saki then wrote more using Japanese scales and the two put everything together and finished writing when Leclercq visited Japan.

Equipment
Saki has been sponsored by Killer Guitars for over 10 years, and often uses custom-made Fascist models. When she first joined Mary's Blood, she mainly used a KG-Fascist Grave Stone, a signature model of Seikima-II guitarist Luke Takamura that has a body sculpted to have a stone-like texture and a carving of a hand leaving scratch marks. She named hers  and swapped the pickups to Seymour Duncan; a '59 Bridge (SH-1b) in the front, and a Duncan Custom (TB-5) in the back. Saki then had  made, a red KG-Fascist Vice model with an EMG 81 pickup in the front, an EMG 85 in the back, and a steampunk pick guard. In 2021, Killer released her signature model, the KG-Fascinator Seven the Empress. After borrowing a prototype seven-string guitar from Killer to record "Angel's Ladder", Saki started writing songs for seven-strings and had them make one using the Stratocaster-like shaped body of the Fascist Vice. With the body made out of alder because she likes the sound, she had the maple neck with ebony fretboard made slightly thinner than most seven-string guitars because of her small hands. It has Seymour Duncan pickups, a SH-10b-7 Full Shred in the front and a SH-8b-7 Invader in the back, and a "galaxy black" paint job with cherry blossom petals added because she wanted it to still be cute and "girlish". Saki named hers . She also has signature guitar picks with Killer.

To commemorate her tenth anniversary as a musician, Saki partnered with Young Guitar Magazine to create a line of limited edition guitar straps. The guitarist revealed that manufactured guitar slides are too big for her thin fingers, so she inspected all the bottles in her house until finding that salt bottles fit perfectly and said she planned to bring them on tour with her. Saki's Marshall Custom Shop Tattoo Series amplifiers have become one of her trademarks. It has a CSJVM410T5 head and a CS1960AT5 cabinet, with a Fractal Audio Systems Axe-Fx III. She bought it due to its flashy paint job of a skeleton and said it was the only one in Japan at the time because the distributor thought no one would want them. In April 2022, her guitar pedalboard consisted of a MIDI foot controller to the Axe-Fx III, a Boss FV-500 volume pedal, and a Morley 20/20 Bad Horsie Wah (MTBH2) wah pedal.

Discography

Solo
"Brightness" (February 10, 2021)

With Mixx
, Oricon Singles Chart Peak Position: 111
 107
"Heavy Metal Sweets" (January 12, 2011)

Mixx - Japanese Edition (August 10, 2011)

With Re:Maker
Neo-Invasion (August 25, 2012)

With Amahiru
Amahiru (November 27, 2020), Oricon Albums Chart Peak Position: 114

Other work
Zwei; Neo Masque (2015) – guitar on "H-A-R-D-E-R" and "Star Queen -Action 2-"
Animetal the Second; Blizzard of Animetal the Second (2016) – guitar on "Fallen Angel" and "Kimi ga Suki da to Sakebitai"
Yashiro; Astraia (2017) – guitar on "Frozen Rose"
XTeen; "Eclipse" (2018) – guitar
XTeen; "Romanticist" (2018) – guitar
XTeen; "The New Black" (2019) – guitar
XTeen; "Gloria" (2022) – guitar
XTeen; Helthy Smile Punk Rock! Vol. 2 (2023) – guitar on "I Wanna Be Your Dog"
Kisaki; Providence (2023) – guitar
Kisaki; Afterglow (2023) – guitar

References

External links

1990 births
21st-century Japanese guitarists
21st-century Japanese women musicians
21st-century women guitarists
Japanese heavy metal guitarists
Japanese songwriters
Living people
Musicians from Kanagawa Prefecture
Seven-string guitarists
Women in metal